{{Infobox alpine ski racer
|name           = Peter Fill
|image          = Peter Fill Hinterstoder 2011.jpg
|image_size     = 200
|caption        = Peter Fill in February 2011
|country        = 
|disciplines    = Downhill, Super-G, Combined
|club           = CS Carabinieri
|sponsor        = 
|birth_date     = 
|birth_place    = Brixen, South Tyrol, Italy
|height         = 175 cm

|wcdebut        = 7 March 2002 (age 19)
|retired        = 1 February 2020
|website        = peter-fill.com
|olympicteams   = 4 (2006, 2010, 2014, 2018)
|olympicmedals  = 0
|olympicgolds   = 
|worldsteams    = 7 (2003–13, 2017)|worldsmedals   = 2
|worldsgolds    = 0
|wcseasons      = 17 (2002–2018)
|wcwins         = 3 (2 DH, 1 SG)          
|wcpodiums      = 22 (13 DH, 5 SG, 4 AC)  
|wcoveralls     = 0 – (6th in 2007, 2017)|wctitles       = 3 – (2 DH, 1 AC)
|show-medals    = yes
|medaltemplates = 

}}

Peter Fill (born 12 November 1982) is a former World Cup alpine ski racer from northern Italy. Born in Brixen, South Tyrol, he formerly competed in all disciplines, and later focused on the speed events of downhill, super-G, and combined. Fill won the World Cup season title in downhill in 2016 and in 2017, and the combined title in 2018.

Career
Fill is an all-round skier. In the 2007 season, Fill was among the overall leaders for the overall World Cup title, the first Italian since Alberto Tomba to rank in the overall top ten.

Fill learned to ski at the age of 3 with the help of his first teacher Frieda Senoner.  He achieved his first successes during his middle-school years, while he was coached by Peter Thomaseth. In 1997/98 he joined the Seiser Alm training center, where he was coached by his uncle Arnold. In the same year he joined the B-Pool of the Bolzano-Bozen ski team (coached by Sepp Steinwandter). One year later he advanced to the A-Pool under Stephan Feichter. In 1999, he won every discipline at the National Junior Championships and returned home with four gold medals; he was called "the phenomenon" by the Italian press.

In 2000, Fill joined the national team for the first time. His coach was Ernst Pfeifhofer, who continued as his coach for the following year in the Italian B-Team.  At the same time he became a member of the Carabinieri sportsgroup. As a junior in 2001, he achieved his first important success on an international level, a bronze medal in the super-G at the Junior World Championships.

In 2002/03 he was part of the A-Team of Flavio Roda for the first time. In February 2002, Fill won the World Juniors and, as a result, took part in his first super-G race of World Cup on 7 March 2002 at Altenmarkt in Austria, where he placed  12th outpacing the Norwegian Lasse Kjus by one hundredth of a second. While Fill's strengths are the downhill and super-G, he is also competitive in the technical disciplines. On 13 January 2006 he stood 3rd on the Ski World Cup podium of the super combined race in Wengen (Switzerland).

During the 2006 and 2007 World Cup seasons, Fill had seven podiums: four in downhill, two in super-G, and a combined, but no wins. On March 21, 2007, he became Italian Champion in multiple disciplines (twice in super-G and once in giant slalom), bringing his career total of national championships to 3.

During the 2008 season, he was unable to reach the podium but managed to place in the top ten 10 on six occasions.
On 29 November 2008 in Lake Louise (Canada) he won his first World Cup competition, beating Swiss Carlo Janka and Swede Hans Olsson, becoming the seventh Italian in World Cup history to win a downhill competition.

On 4 February 2009, he won the silver medal in super-G during the World Championships in Val-d'Isère (France) on the icy and steep slope Face del Bellevarde. He managed to place himself before the three-time World Champion Aksel Lund Svindal, but was not fast enough to beat the Swiss Didier Cuche.
His medal was the only one won by the Azzurri in the men's competitions.

Fill won his second World Cup race in 2016, the downhill at Kitzbühel, on a difficult dark and windy day on the Streif that ended the season of overall leader Aksel Lund Svindal. Fill went on to become the first Italian to win the World Cup downhill title, finishing 10th at the last downhill of the season in St. Moritz in March 2016 to finish 26 points ahead of Svindal.

Personal 
Fill is a cousin of retired giant slalom racer and fellow Kastelruther Denise Karbon. After junior high school, he started working as an auto body mechanic while attending a vocational school, which he left after becoming more involved in alpine skiing competitions. His mother tongue is German but he is also fluent in Italian and English. His idol in everyday life is his uncle Norbert Rier, leader of the Kastelruther Spatzen (a well-known folk group, especially in German-speaking countries) who dedicated the song "Wiedermal a super Zeit" to Fill for his silver medal in super-G at the World Championships in Val-d'Isère in 2009.

Since 2007, Fill's manager has been Andreas Goller, who previously represented Kristian Ghedina. His ski technician is South-Tyrolean Sepp Kuppelwieser (who was ski man for Kjetil André Aamodt, the skier who won the most medals in alpine ski history, for ten years).

During the 2009 season, Atomic, Briko, Finstral, and Leki, as official sponsors and suppliers, decided to reward Fill for his excellent results achieved during the season, offering him the chance to win the Artega GT sport car if he were to capture the downhill at the World Cup finals in Sweden at Åre in March.

World Cup results
Season titles
 3 titles  – (2 downhill - 1 combined)

Season standings

Race podiums
 3 wins (2 DH, 1 SG)  
 22 podiums (13 DH, 5 SG, 4 AC) 

World Championship results

 Olympic results  

See also
 Italian skiers who closed in top 10 in overall World Cup

References

External links
 
 Peter Fill at Italian Winter Sports Federation (FISI) ''
 Peter Fill at Atomic Skis
 Peter Fill at ski2b.com
 

1982 births
Italian male alpine skiers
Alpine skiers at the 2006 Winter Olympics
Alpine skiers at the 2010 Winter Olympics
Alpine skiers at the 2014 Winter Olympics
Alpine skiers at the 2018 Winter Olympics
Olympic alpine skiers of Italy
Alpine skiers of Centro Sportivo Carabinieri
Germanophone Italian people
Sportspeople from Brixen
Living people
Audi Sport TT Cup drivers
Italian alpine skiing coaches